"Kid" Prince Moore was an American blues musician, from the United States, who recorded 17 songs from 1936 to 1938. Moore played in a Piedmont blues style, similar to that of Blind Blake. Moore also recorded two Gospel Music tracks, "Church Bells" and "Sign of Judgement". Moore also accompanied blues pianist Shorty Bob Parker on six of his own tracks. Bruce Bastin, in his book Red River Blues: The Blues Tradition in the Southeast, suggested that Moore may have originated from The Carolinas but, as of 2017, there is no documented knowledge of Moore's life.

Recordings

Recorded April 8, 1936, in New York for Melotone Records
 "Mississippi Water" - Unissued
 "Bite Back Blues" - Unissued
 "Pickin' Low Cotton" (Take 1) - Unissued
 "Pickin Low Cotton" (Take 2) - Unissued 
 "Bug Juice Blues" - 18971=2

Recorded April 10, 1936, in New York for Melotone Records
 "Church Bells" - 18988
 "Sign of Judgement" - 18989

Recorded April 11, 1936, in New York for Melotone Records
 "South Bound Blues" - Unissued
 "Honey Dripping Papa" - 18999
 "Market Street Rag" (Take 1) - Unissued
 "Market Street Rag" (Take 2) - Unissued

Recorded June 6, 1938 in Charlotte, North Carolina for Decca Records
Accompanied by Shorty Bob Parker on all tracks
 "Talkin' About the Snuff" - 64056 (Acc. by Shorty Bob Parker)
 "That's Lovin' Me" - 64057
 "Sally Long Blues" - 64058
 "Ford V-8 Blues" - 64059
 "Single Man Blues" - 64060
 "Bear Meat Blues" - 64061

Accompanying Shorty Bob Parker
 "Death of Slim Green" - 64052
 "I'm Through With Love" - 64053
 "Ridin' Dirty Motorsickle" - 64054
 "Tired of Being Drug Around" - 64055
 "Rain And Snow" - 64062
 "So Cold In China" - 64063

References

American blues guitarists
American male guitarists
American blues singers
Piedmont blues musicians
20th-century American guitarists
20th-century American male singers
20th-century American singers
African-American guitarists
20th-century African-American male singers